Orange jessamine is a common name for two species of plants:

 Murraya paniculata, a species of plant in the family Rutaceae
 Cestrum aurantiacum, a species of plant in the family Solanaceae